Bridget Franek (born November 8, 1987 in Cleveland) is an American middle distance runner who was in the U.S. Olympic team for the 2012 Summer Olympics in the 3000 meter steeplechase.

High school career
Franek is the child of parents Tom and Rosalie, who were runners in high school and college. Franek grew up in Hiram Township and graduated from Crestwood High School in Mantua, Ohio in 2006.

College career
Franek graduated in 2010 from Penn State University and graduated in 2014 from University of Oregon Sports Marketing MBA. She was the Big Ten Freshman of the Year in 2007.  She was the bronze medalist in the NCAA outdoor steeplechase championship in 2008 with a time of 9:58.74. She was the NCAA outdoor steeplechase champion in 2010 with a time of 9:38.86.

Post-college career
Franek was the runner-up for the U.S. outdoor steeplechase title in 2011 and 2012.
She qualified for the 2012 Summer Olympics by placing second at the U.S. Olympic trials in the 3000 meter steeplechase with a time of 9:35.62. In her Olympic heat, she placed fifth with a time of 9:29.86. She advanced to the final based on time qualification.  In the Olympic final she finished 14th. Franek was the first place woman at the 2015 Warrior Dash World Championship obstacle race in October 2015 and she received a $30,000 prize.

USA National Championships

Track and field

See also
List of Pennsylvania State University Olympians

References

External links

Living people
1987 births
Track and field athletes from Ohio
Penn State Nittany Lions women's track and field athletes
People from Portage County, Ohio
American female steeplechase runners
Olympic track and field athletes of the United States
Athletes (track and field) at the 2012 Summer Olympics
World Athletics Championships athletes for the United States